Clann na nGael is a Gaelic Athletic Association club based in Rathcairn / Athboy, in County Meath, Ireland. The club was founded in 2002, combining the two former GAA teams of O'Growney Club Athboy (a hurling and football club), and An Ghaeltacht Rath Cairn (football-only club). The club fields both Gaelic football and hurling teams. It competes in Meath GAA competitions. The club takes part in the annual Peile na Gaelige also.

Honours

As O'Growney Club Athboy:
Meath Senior Hurling Championship: 8
 1924, 1926, 1928, 1929, 1966, 1967, 1968, 1972
 Meath Junior Football Championship: 2007, 2019
 Leinster Junior Club Football Championship: 2007.Runners up 2019

External links
Official Clann na nGael GAA Club website

References

Gaelic games clubs in County Meath
Gaelic football clubs in County Meath
Hurling clubs in County Meath